The 6-millimeter or 47 GHz band is a portion of the EHF (microwave) radio spectrum internationally allocated to amateur radio and amateur satellite use between 47.0 GHz and 47.2 GHz.

Due to the lack of commercial off the shelf radios, amateurs who operate on the 6 mm band must design and construct their own equipment.  Amateurs often use the band to experiment with the maximum communication distance they can achieve, and they also use it occasionally for radio contesting.  In some areas, amateurs maintain 47 GHz propagation beacons on mountain tops.  The band has been successfully used by amateurs in moon bounce contacts.

Allocation 
The International Telecommunication Union allocates 47.0 GHz to 47.2 GHz to amateur radio and amateur satellites on a primary basis in all three ITU regions.

It is the only EHF band amateurs do not share with other radio services, and it is the only band above 2 meters which is exclusively for the amateur services in its entirety.

List of notable frequencies 
 47.0882 GHz Narrow band calling frequency
 47.088 GHz Propagation beacons

Distance records 
The current world distance record on the 6 mm band was  set by US stations AD6FP and W6QIW on September 19, 2015.

In Australia, the 6 mm distance record was  set by stations VK5KK/3 and VK5ZD/3 on November 14, 2019.

The 6 mm Earth-Moon-Earth record was  set by stations AD6FP and RW3BP on January 23, 2005.

See also 
 Amateur radio frequency allocations

References

External links 
 UK Amateur Radio in 47GHz Radio Society of Great Britain
 UK Microwave Group's 47 GHz page
 Map of 47 GHz beacons in UK
 First 47 GHz VUCC Mount Greylock Expeditionary Force
 Construction of a 47 GHz Transverter

Amateur radio bands